Sophronia finitimella is a moth of the family Gelechiidae. It was described by Rebel in 1905. It is found in Asia Minor and Greece.

The wingspan is about 13 mm. Adults are similar to Sophronia acaudella.

References

Moths described in 1905
Sophronia (moth)